Ali Samadov (born 6 September 1997) is an Azerbaijani footballer who plays as a midfielder for Kapaz in the Azerbaijan Premier League.

Club career
On 13 March 2016, Samadov made his debut in the Azerbaijan Premier League for Kapaz match against Khazar Lankaran.

References

External links
 

1997 births
Living people
Association football midfielders
Azerbaijani footballers
Azerbaijan youth international footballers
Azerbaijan Premier League players
Kapaz PFK players